Rathmines School was a secondary school in the suburb of Rathmines, Dublin: it opened in 1855 and closed in 1899. In all 2,190 pupils attended the school.

Notable pupils
 Edward Vaughan Boulger (1846– 11 August 1910), Professor of Classics in the University of Adelaide. Taught at Rathmines c. 1870–1871
 Henry Horatio Dixon FRS (May 19, 1869, Dublin – December 20, 1953, Dublin) plant biologist and professor at Trinity College Dublin.
 Evelyn Charles Hodges (8 August 1887 - 18 March 1980) Bishop of Limerick, Ardfert and Aghadoe, 1943 to 1960 and died on 18 March 1980.
 James Bennett Keene (25 October 1849 – 5 August 1919)Bishop of Meath from 1897 to 1919
 Septimus Drummond "Sep" Lambert''' (3 August 1876 in Dublin, Ireland – 21 April 1959 in Dublin) cricketer.
 Hugh Jackson Lawlor (11 December 1860 - 26 December 1938) priest and author
 Arthur Alcock Rambaut (21 September 1859 - 14 October 1923)  astronomer 
 Daniel Frederick Rambaut (6 August 1865 – 30 November 1937) psychiatrist and rugby player

References

Former Secondary schools in Dublin (city)
Educational institutions established in 1855
Educational institutions disestablished in 1899
Rathmines School
1855 establishments in Ireland